The Hubble Origins Probe (HOP) was a proposal for an orbital telescope made in 2005 in response to the first cancellation of the fourth Hubble Space Telescope (HST) servicing mission.  It would have used an Atlas V rocket or similar launch vehicle to launch a much lighter, unaberrated mirror and optical telescope assembly, using the instruments that had already been built for SM4, along with a new wide-field imager. It would have cost between $700 million and $1 billion.

Funding for the mission was never allocated; in February 2005, Sean O'Keefe, the NASA administrator who had cancelled SM4, resigned. Michael D. Griffin, NASA administrator after O'Keefe, reinstated the servicing missions, making HOP redundant.

References

External links
Hubble Origins Probe
Replacing Hubble by Francis Reddy on astronomy.com
AIP Bulletin of Science Policy News article, "Witnesses Question Priority of a Hubble Servicing Mission" 
NASA Mission Pages: Service Mission 4 (SM4)
Hubble Space Telescope (HST) Service Mission 4 (SM4) Crew Training video (archive.com)

Hubble Space Telescope
Space telescopes